Virus was a Norwegian avant-garde metal band signed to Jester Records. It was formed in 2000 by Carl-Michael Eide. Czral considered the band a continuation of his previous band Ved Buens Ende because of similar musical elements and an avant garde form of unusual experimentation, although the band had its own characteristic sound.

History
Virus released their debut, Carheart, in August 2003.  The band released their second album The Black Flux on November 10, 2008 through Season of Mist. A third album, The Agent That Shapes the Desert, was released in February 2011.  An EP, Oblivion Clock, was released on 1 December 2012. The fourth and latest album, Memento Collider, was released on June 3, 2016. The band announced their breakup via Facebook on November 13, 2018.

Band members
Czral (Carl-Michael Eide) - Guitars, Vocals (see also Ved Buens Ende, Aura Noir, Dødheimsgard, Cadaver, Infernö, Satyricon)
Plenum (Petter Berntsen) - Bass (see also Audiopain)
Esso/Einz (Einar Sjurso) - Drums (see also Lamented Souls, Beyond Dawn, Infernö)

Discography
Carheart (2003)
The Black Flux (2008)
The Agent That Shapes the Desert (2011)
Oblivion Clock (EP; 2012)
Memento Collider (2016)
Investigator (EP; 2017)

References

External links
Virus at Myspace
Virus at Encyclopaedia Metallum
Virus Interview with Crzal, December 2008

Musical groups established in 2000
2000 establishments in Norway
Musical groups from Oslo
Season of Mist artists